ASCAR (Anglo-American Stock Car Racing), was a stock car racing series that raced at circuits around the United Kingdom and Europe from 2001 until 2008. The series went through many guises during its seven year period and was known as the ASCAR Mintex Cup from 2001 to 2003, later known as the Days of Thunder Racing Series (2004) and the SCSA (Stock Car Speed Association) (2005 to 2007) before its final season as the SCSA MAC Tools VSR V8 Trophy. Although going through these varying identities the series was commonly referred to and known by its original name of ASCAR. The series predominantly raced the oval tracks at the Rockingham Motor Speedway and the EuroSpeedway Lausitz in the early years but in its final season in 2008 was solely road racing series that would visit various tracks in the UK most notably Brands Hatch and in France at Croix en Ternois. The series folded in 2008 and merged into part of the European Late Model Series in 2009, racing in Belgium and the UK. 

Constructor cars consisted of NASCAR style Chevrolet, Ford and Pontiac racers with a field that peaked at 37 drivers competing during the 2002 season. John Mickel was the first ever champion with a different driver winning the title over all six-seasons, with Team West-Tec, RML and Torquespeed each winning two drivers championships each. Colin White and John Steward were the only drivers who raced in every season, whilst various drivers from a range of different styles of motorsport competed either single races or single seasons, most notably Colin McRae, Aaron Slight, Jason Plato, Max Papis, and the 2002 champion Nicolas Minassian.

History

The ASCAR Mintex Cup made its debut in 2001 with the first ever race being held at the Rockingham Motor Speedway on 26 May, the race was won by former two-time BTCC champion John Cleland for his Chevrolet-powered Cleland Speedsport team. The event that took part in front of 12,000 fans saw Cleland qualify on pole, however he had to fight back to win the race which had seen six-different race leaders  Further rounds at Rockingham, Knockhill Racing Circuit in Scotland, EuroSpeedway Lausitz in Germany and Mondello Park in Ireland were cancelled due to a fuel pickup issue, so Round 2 didn't hit the calendar until 26 August back at Rockingham. The initial season saw 14 teams fielding 21 cars with the season eventually being won by John Mickel of Torquespeed, by beating Dutchman Michael Vergers in the final race by 0.2 seconds, winning the title despite only two wins to Vergers three. Following his championship win, Mickel stated "I owe it all to my crew. We've grown up around the short ovals together and most of them have been with me since I was 10, they didn't let me down. They won it for me."

The 2002 season saw the peak number of drivers racing in the series with 37 taking part during the year, representing a total of 13 teams. Each race event would partner the BRSCC Pickup Truck Racing, with the series being split between six-events at Rockingham, and two in Lausitz consisting of a total of 20 rounds. The season saw its first American competitors compete as NASCAR drivers Randy Tolsma and Brandon Whitt both drove the no.48 Deuce Racing car, whereas Colin McRae, Darren Manning, Matt Neal and Jason Plato all joined XCEL Motorsport. Darren Turner registered six-wins during the season but having missed the opening five-rounds he would only place 7th in the Championship with the title going to French driver Nicolas Minassian of RML Group who only won the one race back in Round 2. 

In 2003 the series took on the additional name of "Days of Thunder" after the film of the same name, the season was reduced to 13 rounds spanning over 8 events at both Rockingham and Lausitz. Minassian's replacement at RML, Ben Collins took six race victories, all coming in the final eight rounds of the season. In 2004 the ASCAR label was dropped completely and the series was labelled as the "Days of Thunder Racing Series", the series also dropped the Germany races due to the costs involved and the projected grid numbers of cars willing to make the journey. The season which now ran exclusively from Rockingham was won by Stevie Hodgson of TorqueSpeed.

2005 saw the series renamed once again "Stock Car Speed Association" (SCSA) after a link-up with the American Speed Association and incorporated the Pickup Truck Racing Series under the same banner. Michael Vergers who had been with the series since the inaugural season took the title for Team West-Tec winning three of the twelves rounds which once more were all held at Rockingham. In 2006 the SCSA and Pickup Truck Racing ran at Rockingham as part of the "Thunder Sundays" package organised by the BRSCC. The series continued to field only the twelve rounds and the participating number of drivers was moved down to 18. Oli Playle took the title with a dominating season scoring eight race wins.

The SCSA name remained for 2007; as part of a new sponsorship deal competitors competed for the 'SCSA MAC Tools V8 Trophy'. On Wednesday 5 September, British motorsport publication Motorsport News reported that the SCSA would come to an end after the final race of this season. However, the teams, and the organisers of the Mac Tools V8 Trophy vowed to continue in 2008, whether as a MSA Sanctioned championship, or just as a "series". The final recognised oval racing season was won by Colin White, with the field reduced once more to seven rounds, competed by only 15 drivers. 2008 heralded a new direction for the series with a focus on road courses due to a lack of dates offered by the oval tracks. The cars ran as part of the VSR Series, with the stock cars known as the VSR V8 Trophy. In 2009 the series joined with CAMSO V8 to form the new European Late Model Series.

Race days
In 2003 the series took on the additional name of "Days of Thunder" after the film of the same name. This was done as a marketing tool as starting in this year they promoted the series as a day out for all the family and had appearances from bands such as Busted and The Darkness.

Teams and Cars
ASCAR fielded the latest NASCAR Generation 4 variant race machines at the time, a combined field of 5.7 litre V8s tuned to 470bhp & sporting Ford Taurus, Chevrolet Monte Carlo or Pontiac Grand Prix body shells.

In 1992, the Gen 4 car arrived at the sport when steel bodies became primarily custom made instead of using stock pieces, and wind tunnels became a staple as teams worked to gain aerodynamics. 

1994 was also the final year that V6 engines were used in the Busch Series, as many short track series had abandoned six-cylinder engines.

The Gen 4 car was used full time until 2007, and it was retired in the Cup Series after the 2007 season (in which Toyota, who had already competed in the NASCAR Craftsman Truck Series, made their debut in the Cup and the then-Busch Series with the Camry), while the other sixteen races were run by the fifth-generation Car of Tomorrow. The Car of Tomorrow went full-time in 2008, with the second-tier series adopting their own Car of Tomorrow first part-time in 2010 and full-time the following year. Body panels in the style of the Gen 4 car continue to be manufactured by Five Star Race Car Bodies, and were legal in the ARCA Racing Series until 2020, when composite-bodied cars in the style of the Generation 6 were mandated (despite this, modern ARCA cars still use Gen 4 chassis). As of 2022, the Gen 4 car is still legal in the ARCA Menards Series West and East (though Dodge body panels are illegal); Hailie Deegan scored her first NASCAR win at the Las Vegas Motor Speedway dirt track in a Gen 4 Toyota Camry in 2019.

In the generation's final years, aerodynamic development led to some of the cars (otherwise known as "offset" bodies) being called "twisted sisters" in reference to the asymmetrical shapes of the car's body. The Car of Tomorrow, by contrast, featured a symmetrical body in order to curb aerodynamic development wars in an attempt to cut costs.

Drivers

The inaugural championship in 2001 was won by future NASCAR driver John Mickel racing for Torquespeed. In 2002 French driver Nicolas Minassian of RML Group arrived from CART and took the title. Further Champions were Ben Collins in 2003, who also worked as The Stig on Top Gear during his ASCAR tenure, Stevie Hodgson, Michael Vergers, Oli Playle and Colin White.

Although most of the field often included a field of British professional and semi-professional stock car drivers, a number of well-known racing drivers from across a wide variety of series competed, often racing either single races or for one full season. They included former WRC champion Colin McRae, ex Formula 1 drivers Max Papis and Kelvin Burt, former IndyCar series driver Darren Manning, former World Superbike Championship rider Aaron Slight, American Nascar drivers Randy Tolsma, Brandon Whitt and Steve Grissom also took part, as did former BTCC champions Jason Plato, Matt Neal and John Cleland. Aside from Ben Collins, future Top Gear presenter Chris Harris took part in the 2004 season, and fellow motoring journalists Tiff Needell and Amanda Stretton raced in the debut 2001 season. Toby Scheckter the son of 1979 F1 champion Jody competed in the 2002 season.

Notable Drivers

Nationalities
The nationalities of every driver who participated in an ASCAR race from 2001 to 2007.

Previous champions

Tracks

Between 2004 and 2007 all of the ASCAR races were held at the Rockingham Motor Speedway in England. The circuit was overlooked by the 6280 seat Rockingham Building, a steel-framed, glass-fronted grandstand building containing suites, offices, bars and kitchens, and by four grandstands. Together the building and grandstands offered a total seating capacity of 52,000. The inner pit and paddock complex was accessed from the Rockingham Building via two pedestrian tunnels and there was a further spectator viewing area on top of the pit garages. The 1.48 mile American-style banked oval circuit was 18.3 metres (60.0 ft) wide and had a maximum bank angle of seven degrees and comprised four very distinct corners. Rockingham's oval was unique in the UK and one of only two speedways in Europe (the other is Lausitzring). The oval circuit could also be converted to a road course layout for events by positioning temporary chicanes and curves both on the main area and apron of the circuit.

In 2002 and 2003 the series also raced in Germany at the EuroSpeedway Lausitz but the venue was eventually dropped due to the costs involved and the projected grid numbers of cars willing to make the journey. The entire 2008 season was a road racing based series as opposed to the Oval circuits. This incorporated trips to Snetterton, Cadwell Park, Lydden Race Circuit, Brands Hatch, Pembrey Circuit, Mallory Park and the French race track at Croix en Ternois.

Television coverage
In the United Kingdom, Motors TV aired full races of ASCAR, whilst Channel 4 aired a highlight show presented by Helen Chamberlain. In 2004 SCSA coverage reached 44 million viewers.

List of race winners

See also

Hot Rods (oval racing)
Pickup Truck Racing
NASCAR Whelen Euro Series
NASCAR

References

External links

Stock car racing in the United Kingdom
Auto racing organizations
Stock car racing series
Stock car racing
Auto racing series in the United Kingdom
ASCAR
Recurring sporting events established in 2001
Recurring sporting events disestablished in 2008
Auto racing series in Germany
Auto racing series in France